Devil's Crush is a pinball video game developed by Compile for the TurboGrafx-16 and released in 1990. The second installment in the Crush Pinball series after Alien Crush, the game has an eerie occult theme with skulls, skeletons, and demons. It was later followed by Jaki Crush and Alien Crush Returns.

The game was ported to the Sega Mega Drive/Genesis, retitled Dragon's Fury (Devil Crash MD in Japan) by developer Technosoft. Both North American versions, TurboGrafx-16 and Genesis, are censored—all hexagrams have been changed to generic stars, and coffins with crucifixes on them in one bonus stage have been changed to vases. Devil's Crush was later released on the Wii's Virtual Console, with the European release reverting to its original title; however, the pentagram symbols were removed and replaced with an 8-sided star. It also saw release on the Wii U eShop in 2017.

Gameplay

The playfield of Devil's Crush consists of a free scrolling pinball table three screens high. There are three pairs of flippers. The player can nudge/bump the table to influence the ball's path. Using the tilt button too much will result in the game "tilting" and the flippers will stop working, causing a lost ball. There are many targets to shoot for and hidden bonus rooms.

In the Genesis version, after the player achieves the highest score and beats the table, there is a battle against a final boss and his minions on a much smaller table.

Reception

Devil's Crush has generally been critically applauded. Damien McFerran of Nintendo Life noted the game's audiovisual presentation, stating: "The graphics are really stunning, the designers were obviously smoking something strong when they created this game. The music is also noteworthy, with a brilliant main theme that never gets annoying or repetitive." Frank Provo gave an overall positive review in GameSpot, despite complaints about the pinball physics: "While the ball generally behaves like it's supposed to, it does feel lighter than it should, and it will occasionally ricochet off a wall at an unbelievable angle. Unless you're dead serious about your pinball, though, you'll come to terms with the ball's unique quirks real quick. The intricate table, the flashy visuals, and the surreal setting make it very easy to overlook a few goofy caroms."

The TurboGrafx version reached the top of the Computer & Video Games charts.

Electronic Gaming Monthly listed the TurboGrafx-16 version as number 50 on its "100 Best Games of All Time" in 1997, calling it "the best video pinball game of all time—mainly because it didn't try to be anything like real pinball."

See also
 Dragon's Revenge
 Demon's Tilt

Notes

References

External links

Devil's Crush Strategy Guide (TurboGrafx-16) at TurboPlay Magazine Archives

1990 video games
Compile (company) games
Crush Pinball
Fantasy video games set in the Middle Ages
Kaga Create games
Multiplayer and single-player video games
Pinball video games
PlayStation Network games
Sega Genesis games
Technosoft games
Tengen (company) games
TurboGrafx-16 games
Video games developed in Japan
Video games scored by Toshiaki Sakoda
Virtual Console games
Virtual Console games for Wii U